LA 10 FC is an American soccer team playing in the United Premier Soccer League. The club is partly owned by former Italian international and World Cup winner Alessandro Del Piero, and the club name bears his jersey number. The club shares similar branding to another Del Piero enterprise, the ADP10 Football Academy based in Los Angeles. LA 10 won promotion to the 2019 UPSL SoCal North Division 1 after an unbeaten season in the 2018 UPSL SoCal North "Championship Division" (division 2).

References

External links 
 LA 10 FC Official Website
 ADP10: Alessandro Del Piero Football Academies

 United Premier Soccer League teams
 Sports in Los Angeles
 Soccer in Los Angeles